The 55th Annual TV Week Logie Awards was held on Sunday 7 April 2013 at the Crown Palladium in Melbourne, and broadcast on the Nine Network and simulcast of Today Network's radio stations. Public voting for the "Most Popular" categories were conducted through an online survey from late November 2012 to 10 February 2013. Nominations were announced on 11 March 2013. Network Ten's Offspring received the most nominations with eight. Hamish and Andy's Euro Gap Year, Hamish and Andy's Caravan of Courage: Australia Vs New Zealand, Home and Away, Howzat! Kerry Packer's War, and Puberty Blues each received five nominations. Television presenter Brian Henderson was inducted into the Logies Hall of Fame.

Winners and nominees
In the tables below, winners are listed first and highlighted in bold.

Gold Logie

Acting/Presenting

Most Popular Programs

Most Outstanding Programs

Presenters

Hamish Blake
Andy Lee
Adam Hills
Dave Hughes
Julia Morris
Shane Bourne
Lisa Wilkinson
Rebecca Gibney
Eddie Perfect
Scott Cam
Kat Stewart
Shane Jacobson
Sonia Kruger
Jennifer Byrne
Mandy McElhinney
Jenny Brockie

Bert Newton
Molly Meldrum
Olly Murs
Chris Brown 
Hugh Sheridan
Jennifer Hawkins
Richard Wilkins
Carrie Bickmore
David Campbell
Craig Reucassel
Julian Morrow
Darren McMullen
Mike Munro
Michelle Bridges
Karl Stefanovic

Performers
Bruno Mars – "Locked Out of Heaven"
Michael Bublé – "It's a Beautiful Day"
Birdy – "Skinny Love"
Olly Murs – "Army of Two"

Most nominations
By network
 Nine Network – 37
 ABC – 32
 Network Ten – 28
 Seven Network – 17
 Foxtel – 8
 SBS – 5
Source:

 By program
 Offspring (Network Ten) – 8
 Hamish and Andy's Euro Gap Year (Nine Network) / Hamish and Andy's Caravan of Courage: Australia Vs New Zealand (Nine Network) / Home and Away (Seven Network) / Howzat! Kerry Packer's War (Nine Network) / Puberty Blues (Network Ten) – 5
 House Husbands (Nine Network) / Mabo (ABC1) / Redfern Now (ABC1) / Underbelly: Badness (Nine Network) – 4
 Four Corners (ABC1) / Packed to the Rafters (Seven Network) / The Project (Network Ten) / Underground: The Julian Assange Story (Network Ten) / The Voice (Nine Network) – 3
Source:

Most awards
By network
Nine Network – 8
ABC – 7
Network Ten – 4
Seven Network – 3
SBS / Foxtel – 1
Source:

By program
Howzat! Kerry Packer's War (Nine Network) / Offspring (Network Ten) / Redfern Now (ABC1) / The Voice (Nine Network) – 2
Source:

In Memoriam
The In Memoriam segment was introduced by Peter Overton who spoke of the passing of Peter Harvey. The Melbourne Gospel Choir performed Foo Fighters "Times Like These". The following deceased were honoured:

 Suzie Howie, publicist
 Brian Wright, executive
 Jonathan Hardy, actor
 Binny Lum, host
 Max Stuart, executive
 Alan Bateman, writer, producer
 Bille Brown AM, actor
 Craig Watkins, cameraman
 Jon Finlayson, actor
 Peter Skelton, cameraman
 Tony Charlton AM, broadcaster
 Len Mauger, executive
 Leverne McDonnell, actress
 Bryce Courtenay AM, author, producer, screenwriter
 Digby Wolfe, writer, host
 Patricia Lovell AM MBE, host
 Bob Meillon, director
 Colin Campbell OAM, presenter
 Nick McMahon, executive
 Albie Thoms, director, producer
 Edith Bliss, presenter
 Colin Duckworth, actor, writer
 Ron Taylor OAM, cameraman
 Darryl Cotton, host
 John Miller, broadcaster
 Dr. Tommy Tycho AM MBE, maestro
 Bruce Robertson, engineer
 Anne Dunn, journalist
 Peter Dean, broadcaster, producer
 Tony Greig, broadcaster

References

External links

 

2013
2013 television awards
2013 in Australian television
2013 awards in Australia